Streptomyces barkulensis is a bacterium species from the genus of Streptomyces which has been isolated from water sediments near the Chilika Lake in the Barkul village in Odisha in India.

See also 
 List of Streptomyces species

References

Further reading

External links
Type strain of Streptomyces barkulensis at BacDive -  the Bacterial Diversity Metadatabase

barkulensis
Bacteria described in 2014